Sarmentose may refer to:

 Sarmentose (botany), a term describing plants which have long slender stolons
 Sarmentose (chemistry), a type of sugar

ar:سرمانتوز (سكر نباتي)